The ʿām al-fīl  (Year of the Elephant) is the name in Islamic history for the year approximately equating to 570–571 CE.  According to Islamic resources, it was in this year that Muhammad was born. The name is derived from an event said to have occurred at Mecca: Abraha, the Abyssinian, Christian ruler of Aksum marched upon the Ka‘bah in Mecca with a large army, which included war elephants, intending to demolish it. However, the lead elephant, known as 'Mahmud' (consonant letters: m-ħ-m-w-d), is said to have stopped at the boundary around Mecca, and refused to enter. It has been mentioned in the Quran that the army was destroyed by small birds that carried pebbles that destroyed the entire army and Abraha perished. Surah Fil in Quran illustrates the incident clearly. The year came to be known as the Year of the Elephant, beginning a trend for reckoning the years in the Arabian Peninsula. This reckoning was used until it was replaced with the Islamic calendar during the times of ‘Umar.

Archaeological discoveries in Southern Arabia suggest that Year of the Elephant may have been 569 or 568, as the Sasanian Empire overthrew the Aksumite-affiliated rulers in Yemen around 570.

The year is also recorded as that of the birth of ‘Ammar ibn Yasir.

Events 
According to early Islamic historians such as Ibn Ishaq, in honor of his ally, Abraha built a great church  at Sana'a known as al-Qullays, a loanword borrowed from εκκλησία "church".

Al-Qullays gained widespread fame, even gaining the notice of the Byzantine Empire. The Arab people of the time had their own center of religious worship and pilgrimage in Mecca, the Kaaba. Abraha attempted to divert their pilgrimage to al-Qullays and appointed a man named Muhammad ibn Khuza'i  to Mecca and Tihamah as a king with a message that al-Qullays was both much better than other houses of worship and purer, having not been defiled by the housing of idols.

Ibn Ishaq's Prophetic biography states:

Abraha, incensed, launched an expedition of sixty thousand men against the Ka‘bah at Mecca, led by a white elephant named Mahmud (and possibly with other elephants - some accounts state there were several elephants, or even as many as eight) in order to destroy the Ka‘bah. Several Arab tribes attempted to fight him on the way, but were defeated.

When news of the advance of Abraha's army came, the Arab tribes of the Quraysh, Banu Kinanah, Banu Khuza'a and Banu Hudhayl united in defense of the Ka‘bah. A man from the Himyarite Kingdom was sent by Abraha to advise them that Abraha only wished to demolish the Kaaba and if they resisted, they would be crushed. ‘Abdul Muttalib told the Meccans to seek refuge in the hills while he with some leading members of the Quraysh remained within the precincts of the Ka‘bah. Abraha sent a dispatch inviting Abdul-Muttalib to meet with Abraha and discuss matters. When Abdul-Muttalib left the meeting he was heard saying, "The Owner of this House is its Defender, and I am sure He will save it from the attack of the adversaries and will not dishonor the servants of His House."

The reference to the story in Qur’an is rather short. According to Surah al-Fil, the next day [as Abraha prepared to enter the city], a dark cloud of small birds named 'Ababil' appeared. The birds carried small rocks in their beaks, and bombarded the Ethiopian forces and smashed them like "eaten straw". However according to Muhammad Asad this surah does not describe birds literally carrying small rocks, he instead, referencing Al-Zamakhshari and Fakhr al-Din al-Razi translates the above mentioned verses as:

According to Mohammad Asad, the words used in this verse, namely the "stones of sijjil", denote  "a writing and, tropically, something that has been decreed [by God]". He further explains that this decree by God was a very sudden epidemic outbreak, which, according to Ibn Ishaq, caused fever (in arabic hasbah) and smallpox (arab. judari). This, as Asad concludes, points to the fact that the "stone hard blows of chastisement pre-ordained" were a very sudden virulent epidemic due to the fact that the word for fever "hasbah" primarily means "pelting [or smiting] with stones" in the famous arabic dictionary al-Qamous (القاموس) by Fairuzabadi. The word ta'ir can denote any "flying creature, whether bird or insect (Taj al-'Arus)".

Shia
According to Hadith, in al-Kafi Volume one, Imam Ali was born in the 20th year of the Elephant and died in AH 40.

Other sources 
This event is referred to in the Qur’an, in Surah 105, Al-Fil ("The Elephant"), and is discussed in its related tafsir.

Some scholars have placed the Year of the Elephant one or two decades earlier than 570 CE, with a tradition attributed to Ibn Shihab al-Zuhri in the works of ‘Abd al-Razzaq al-San‘ani placing it before the birth of Muhammad's father.

See also
 War elephant
 Cultural depictions of elephants

References

External links
 Page at Islamic-Awareness.org discussing the event

Life of Muhammad
History of Mecca
Kaaba
Shia days of remembrance
Pre-Islamic Arabia
Islamic terminology
Elephants in culture
War elephants